Danilo Švara (2 April 1902 San Giuseppe, Italy - 25 April 1981 Ljubljana) was a prominent Slovenian orchestra conductor and composer.

Works

Opera
Kleopatra (1940)
Veronika Deseniška 1946)
Slovo od mladosti (Prešeren) (1954)
Ocean (1969)
Štirje junaki (1974)

References 

1902 births
1981 deaths
Slovenian conductors (music)
Male conductors (music)
Musicians from Trieste
20th-century conductors (music)
20th-century composers
20th-century Italian male musicians